The Inaccessible Island finch (Nesospiza acunhae), also known as the Inaccessible bunting, is a species of bird in the family Thraupidae (formerly in Emberizidae).

It is endemic to Inaccessible Island of the Tristan da Cunha archipelago where its natural habitats are temperate shrubland and subantarctic grassland. It is threatened by habitat loss.

Taxonomy and systematics 
The Inaccessible Island finch was previously considered two species, but the three subspecies are now grouped together.

Subspecies 
The subspecies of this species are:

N. a. acunhae Cabanis, 1873. Found along the coastline, and has a small beak and drab olive-grey plumage, though the male is slightly brighter than the female.

N. a. dunnei Hagen, 1952. Found on the eastern edge of the island's plateau and the coastline, and has a large beak. It is larger than the other subspecies.

N. a. fraseri Ryan, 2008. Found on the Island's plateau at 300–600 meters (984–1969 feet), and has a small beak and bright yellow plumage. It has a large head long wings.

Description 
All subspecies are some shade of olive-green. The call is a repeated series of three to four notes.

Diet 
The Inaccessible Island finch eats mainly seeds and insects. The plants consumed vary by subspecies. N. a. acunhae eats the seeds of Spartinia grasses, such as Sporobolus arundinacea, as well as Carex. N. a. fraseri feeds on Nertera. N.a. dunnei feeds on Phylica. All subspecies of N. acunhae use flies as their main source of prey.

Reproduction 
It breeds from November to February. They are usually monogamous, and partners remain together for successive breeding attempts. Females lay one or two eggs in a cup nest close to the ground.

References
 BirdLife International 2004.  Nesospiza acunhae. 2006 IUCN Red List of Threatened Species. Downloaded 26 July 2007.

Specific

Inaccessible Island finch
Inaccessible Island finch
Taxonomy articles created by Polbot